Yerisbel Miranda Llanes (born 1987) is a Cuban chess player and Woman International Master.

Biography
In 2017, Yerisbel Miranda Llanes was shared first place with Danitza Vázquez and Maritza Arribas Robaina in Women's World Chess Championship American Zone 2.3 tournament, and qualified for the Women's World Chess Championship 2018. In 2017, in Pinar del Río Yerisbel Miranda Llanes won Women's Cuban Chess Championship. In 2018, Yerisbel Miranda Llanes won silver medal after Deysi Cori in Women's Pan American Chess Championship.

Yerisbel Miranda Llanes played for Cuba in the Women's Chess Olympiads:
 In 2018, at reserve board in the 43rd Chess Olympiad (women) in Batumi (=7 =0 -1).

In 2011, she was awarded the FIDE Woman International Master (WIM) title.

References

External links
 
 
 

1987 births
Living people
Cuban female chess players
Chess Woman International Masters